Adesmia araujoi is an endemic perennial species found in Brazil.

References

araujoi